Cushing may refer to:

People 
 Cushing (surname)

Places in the United States 
 Cushing, Iowa
 Cushing, Maine
 Cushing, Minnesota
 Cushing Township, Minnesota
 Cushing, Nebraska
 Cushing, Oklahoma
 Cushing, Texas
 Cushing, Wisconsin
 Cushing Island, Maine

Other uses 
 Cushing Academy, a boarding school in Ashburnham, Massachusetts
 Cushing Hall, a dormitory at Hampden–Sydney College in Hampden Sydney, Virginia
 Cushing House, a dormitory at Vassar College in Poughkeepsie, New York
 Cushing House Museum and Garden in Newburyport, Massachusetts
 Cushing's disease, an endocrine disorder (one of several specific causes of Cushing's syndrome)
 Cushing's syndrome, an endocrine disorder (an umbrella term for several disorders, including Cushing's disease and related disorders)
 Cushing reflex, in response to brain ischemia
 Cushing's triad, a clinical triad
 Cushing ulcer, a gastric ulcer
 USS Cushing (DD-985)

See also
 Justice Cushing (disambiguation)